A divisional buyout  or carveout, in finance, is a transaction in which a corporate division, business unit or subsidiary is acquired using the same financial structuring as a leveraged buyout.

Typically, in these transactions, the financial sponsor will turn the acquired business into a standalone company, necessitating the creation of certain functions that were formerly provided by the parent company.

Divisional reverse leveraged buyout (D-RLBO)

A D-RLBO is a leveraged buyout of a division or subsidiary that subsequently comes to trade on the public markets. From the point of view of a divesting firm, the D-RLBO permits the sale of a subsidiary to its management and/or private investors who subsequently restructure its assets and capital structure with the purpose of enhancing overall firm value.

Avon Products Inc. provides an example. Avon divested specialty jeweler Tiffany & Co. to private equity investors who subsequently accomplished an initial public offering (IPO).

References
Hite, G., & Vetsuypens, M. R. 1989. Management buyouts of divisions and shareholder wealth. The Journal of Finance, 44: 953 – 970.
Singh, H. 1990. Management buyout: Distinguishing characteristics and operating changes priorto public offering. Strategic Management Journal, 11: 111-129.

Corporate finance
Private equity
Corporate development